Marek Zalewski (born 27 July 1970 in Koło) is a retired Polish athlete who competed in sprinting events. He represented his country at two World Championships, in 1991 and 1993. In addition, he won three medals at the 1989 European Junior Championships.

Competition record

Personal bests
Outdoor
100 metres – 10.36 (+1.0 m/s, Warsaw 1992)
200 metres – 20.82 (+0.8 m/s, Warsaw 1992)
Indoor
60 metres – 6.67 (1994)
200 metres – 21.13 (Spała 1993)

References

All-Athletics profile

1970 births
Living people
People from Koło County
Polish male sprinters
World Athletics Championships athletes for Poland
Sportspeople from Greater Poland Voivodeship